Richard R. Renick (born October 14, 1930) is a retired American politician in the state of Florida.

Early life and education
Renick was born in New York and moved to Florida in 1940. He attended St. Mary's High School in Miami and the University of Miami.

Career 
Renick served in the United States Navy for three years and was assigned to the USS Conserver from 1947 to 1949 at Naval Station Pearl Harbor and the Aleutian Islands in Alaska. He served in the Florida House of Representatives from 1966 to 1972, as a Democrat, and the Florida State Senate from 1975 to 1982. He was a cinematographer, television and film director. His brother was Ralph Renick, a television journalist.

References

1930 births
Living people
Democratic Party members of the Florida House of Representatives
People from Pinecrest, Florida
People from Yonkers, New York
Military personnel from New York City
United States Navy sailors
University of Miami alumni